Danny Barnes  (born 7 October 1989) is a New Zealand-born, Irish rugby union player. He can play either centre or wing.

Early life
He moved to Tralee, County Kerry aged ten and played rugby for the local side, Tralee RFC.

Munster
Barnes made his Munster debut against Connacht in April 2010. On 14 May 2011, he scored two tries as Munster defeated the Ospreys 18–11 in the Celtic League semi-final at Thomond Park. He also started against Leinster in the 2011 Celtic League Grand Final.

Barnes scored his third try for Munster in their opening Pro12 match against Newport Gwent Dragons in September 2011. He made his Heineken Cup debut for Munster against Northampton Saints in November 2011. He started for Munster A in their 31-12 2011–12 British and Irish Cup Final victory against Cross Keys on 27 April 2012. It was announced on 14 May 2013 that Barnes would be leaving Munster.

Newcastle Falcons
On 4 June 2013, it was announced that Barnes had joined English Aviva Premiership side Newcastle Falcons on a two-year contract.

Ealing Traifinders
On 12 May 2015, Barnes signed for newly promoted RFU Championship side Ealing Trailfinders for the upcoming 2015–16 season.

Honours
Celtic League:
Winner (1): 2010–11
British and Irish Cup:
Winner (1): 2011–12
RWC U20

References

External links
Munster Profile

1989 births
Living people
Irish rugby union players
Munster Rugby players
Dolphin RFC players
Newcastle Falcons players
Ealing Trailfinders Rugby Club players
Rugby union centres
Rugby union wings
Rugby union players from Auckland